Sirvan Ghorbani (born September 26, 1993) is an Iranian football player. He currently plays for Fajr sepasi in the Persian Gulf Pro League.

References 

1993 births
Living people
Iranian footballers
Association football defenders